Bridgewater State University is a public university with its main campus in Bridgewater, Massachusetts. It is the largest of nine state universities in Massachusetts. Including its off-campus sites in New Bedford, Attleboro, and Cape Cod, BSU has the fourth-largest campus of the 29 institutions in the Massachusetts Public Higher Education System. BSU's sports teams are called the Bears. Its school colors are crimson, white, and black.

History

Foundation

Bridgewater State University was founded by Horace Mann as Bridgewater Normal School. It opened on September 9, 1840, making it the oldest permanently-located institution of public higher education in Massachusetts. As one of the first normal schools in the nation, its initial mission was to train school teachers. Today Bridgewater, which is regarded as the "home of teacher education in America", has the largest enrollment of teacher education students in the Commonwealth of Massachusetts. Since the 1960s, the school has expanded its program to include liberal arts, business, and aviation science. It became a university and took on its present name, Bridgewater State University, in 2010. During its history, it has also been known as Bridgewater State Normal School (1846), Bridgewater State Teachers College (1932), State Teachers College at Bridgewater (1960), and Bridgewater State College (1965).

The normal school opened in the basement of the Old Bridgewater Town Hall, in a 40-foot by 50-foot space, divided into three rooms: an ante-room for students, an apparatus room, and a classroom. The first class consisted of 21 women and seven men. Nicholas Tillinghast, the first principal (1840–53) was initially the only instructor. The school year consisted of two 14-week terms. Students were not required to attend consecutively.

In 1845, the Commonwealth of Massachusetts finally agreed to construct a building for Bridgewater State Normal School, the first building ever erected in America for the preparation of teachers. This two-story wooden building, 64 feet by 42 feet, accommodating 84 students, was to be the institution's educational plant for almost half a century. There were small and large classrooms, with blackboards in each. Since changes were made to the school, the board of education required people to attend three terms for fourteen consecutive weeks, establishing a year's course. The building was dedicated on August 19, 1846, with Horace Mann saying on the occasion: "Among all the lights and shadows that ever crossed my path, this day’s radiance is the brightest...I consider this event as marking an era in the progress of education—which as we all know is the progress of civilization-on this western continent, and throughout the world.  It is the completion of the first normal schoolhouse ever erected in Massachusetts,—in the Union,—in this hemisphere. It belongs to that class of events which may happen once, but are not capable of being repeated. Coiled up in this institution, as in a spring, there is a vigor whose uncoiling may wheel the spheres." This first normal school established a professional standard for the preparation of teachers, breaking away from traditional academics for attendance. It was the next step toward establishing educational institutions for specific purposes.

Bridgewater Normal School trained its students in elementary-school subjects; expansion subjects above the elementary level including mathematics, philosophy, and literature; and pedagogy, including philosophy of teaching and discipline based on child psychology, and as much practical experience under constant supervision as possible at the model school.

1924 fire

An early-morning fire on Wednesday December 10, 1924, destroyed three of the college's buildings, over half of the campus: Tillinghast Hall, the Training School, and old Woodward dormitories. The Normal School and the boiler room were saved. The fire was so large that other towns' fire departments had to be called to assist. The cause of the fire was not definitely established, but it is believed to have been either "rats or mice" gnawing in the heating ducts, or a spontaneous combustion. There were reportedly no injuries.

The Normal School and boiler room were repaired immediately. Tillinghast Hall was rebuilt and a new Woodward dorm built. The training school was housed in a different building temporarily and later a new building was built for it exemplifying a well equipped elementary school, with a gym and playground. The total State appropriation for the Normal School repairs and rebuilding of the training school was $606,566, in addition to $86,500 from the town. The Normal Building and Tillinghast Hall were rebuilt and opened in June 1926, now renamed as Boyden Hall and Harrington Hall.

Mid twentieth century to present
In the 1950s, many veterans of the Korean War enrolled and proms were the highlight of the year for them. In 1957 the John J. Kelly Gym was built and in 1959 SAT scores were required to be submitted for the first time.

During the 1960s the liberal arts curriculum was introduced. The Ivy Exercises, in which the junior class would form an archway with ivy leaves leading up to the school on graduation day, were dying out. In 1960 Pope Hall was built as an all women's dorm. Scott Hall was built in 1961 as an all men's dorm. The Marshall Conant Science Building was built in 1964 and was named after the school's second principal. In 1967 Shea and Durgin Halls were built as co-ed dorms.

In 1971 The Clement C. Maxwell Library was completed. In 1976 the tennis courts opened and students could enjoy movies on Sundays and Tuesdays for 25 to 75 cents. From 1970 to 1990 the college expanded and enrollment quadrupled. The number of faculty tripled. During this time, Education became the most popular major, and remains so today.

In 1992 the college established the School of Education and Allied Studies and the School of Arts and Sciences. In 1995 the Moakley Center opened. From 1999 to 2002 the college had an endowment campaign to raise 10 million dollars to support academics.

In 2010 Bridgewater State was one of the Massachusetts state colleges that chose to become a university. This would boost its popularity, attract more contributions, increase student applications and enrollment, and give the school a higher profile. On July 22, 2010, the Massachusetts House of Representatives and Senate voted to give the college university status and change its name to Bridgewater State University. The measure was signed into law by Massachusetts Governor Deval Patrick on July 28, 2010. Today the university is considered the "Birthplace of teacher education in America", and has one of the most prominent and distinguished Teaching & Education programs in the country. It has the largest teacher enrollment in the Commonwealth of Massachusetts.

Presidents
Nicholas Tillinghast (1840–1853)
Marshall Conant (1853–1860)
Albert Gardner Boyden (1860–1906)
Arthur Boyden (1906–1933)
Zenos E. Scott (1933–1937)
John J. Kelly (1937–1951)
Clement C. Maxwell (1951–1962)
Adrian Rondileau (1962–1986, 1988–1989)
Gerard T. Indelicato (1986–1987)
Adrian Tinsley (1989–2002)
Dana Mohler-Faria (2002–2015)
Frederick W. Clark Jr. (2015–present)

Academics
Bridgewater State University is among America's oldest teacher education institutions, the first to have a building devoted to education of teachers. Bridgewater continues today to lead in the preparation of educators as the largest producer of Massachusetts teachers, holding the highest national ranking available (Title II first quartile). It is one of seven universities accredited in Massachusetts for teacher education according to the National Council for Accreditation of Teacher Education (NCATE) The university is also accredited by the New England Association of Schools and Colleges, The National Association of State Directors of Teacher Education and Certification (NASDTEC), the Board of Higher Education.

The university has 108 majors in 35 areas of studies starting with the popular education, aviation, psychology, accounting, criminal justice and many others. The university has 30 academic departments ranging from Accounting and Finance to Theatre and Dance.

BSU is the second most affordable state university when it comes to undergraduate in-state tuition. Bridgewater State University is accredited by the New England Commission of Higher Education.

Schools to colleges
On July 1, 2010, the former School of Arts and Sciences was split into the School of Humanities and Social Sciences and the School of Science and Mathematics. In October 2010, the School of Humanities and Social Sciences, the School of Science and Mathematics, the Ricciardi School of Business and the School of Graduate Studies, were all renamed colleges, and the Department of Social Work was renamed the School of Social Work. The College of Humanities and Social Sciences currently consist of fifteen academic departments, the Bartlett College of Science and Mathematics has six departments, the College of Education and Health Sciences has five departments, and the Ricciardi College of Business has three.

Fine arts
The university has had active arts programs since the late 19th century. There are three main buildings dedicated to the Arts, the oldest of which is the Art Center (1906) which was originally built as a gymnasium. The Wallace Anderson Gallery on the ground floor of the center was made possible by the Class of 1936. The gallery holds changing exhibitions throughout the year, one exhibition being the student show. The Rondileau Campus Center houses the university's theater department, which puts on six shows a year. Next to and beneath the auditorium stage are classrooms and departmental offices and facilities, including a script library. Attached to the Rondileau Campus Center is the auditorium, which holds 1,300 people. In addition to Bridgewater's own performances, it has hosted the New York City Opera, the Martha Graham Dance Company, and Tony Bennett. A dance studio has been added to Burnell Hall.

Honors program
To be accepted into the Honors Program, an upcoming freshman must have a high school GPA of 3.3 or higher, and once inducted, the student must maintain that 3.3. If the GPA were to fall below that mark, then the student would be put on probation for a semester. However, if GPA were to fall below 2.7, then the student would automatically be removed from the program.

More than eighty percent of the honors student's academic work is completed in non-honors classes. To graduate with honors, a student must have twelve honors credits. A regular honors course is three credits, and the honors colloquia are worth one credit but only meet once a week for fifty minutes. Once in junior year, a student must take departmental honors classes, which are classes that specify in his or her major.

The honors students receive numerous perks, such as their own section in the academic achievement center. There are five computers located in there, all hooked up to a color printer that is free. The honors students also enjoy private events such as a biannual dinner, a fall book club, and an honors thesis workshop for those who are beginning to work on their thesis.

Scott Hall is the home to the residential Honors first-year living-learning community. Weygand Hall is the home to the residential Honors upperclassman living-learning community

Research
The Adrian Tinsley Program (ATP) is the university's undergraduate research program.

Campus

West Campus

Samuel P. Gates House (1876) is a small wood-frame structure that was once the dwelling of Samuel Gates.
Boyden Hall (1924) was constructed as the main building of Bridgewater Normal School following the campus fire of 1924. It now houses the Registrar's Office, Financial Aid services, Student Accounts, the President and Vice President's offices, administrative offices, the department of Information Technology, and several classrooms. On the lowest level, School Street side, is the Horace Mann Auditorium.
Harrington Hall (1926) was named in honor of Lee F. Harrington. Formerly it was the Burnell Campus School (see below). The building houses the School of Business.
Tillinghast Hall (1916), known as "Tilly", is at the corner of School and Summer Streets. Named after the first principal of Bridgewater Normal School, it houses faculty offices, department offices, Flynn Dining Commons, the campus post office, and Military and Veteran Student Services.

The Art Center (1904) was originally constructed as Boyden Gymnasium (an indoor track remains on the second floor). It was converted into the art center in 1974, and now houses the Art Department and the Anderson Art Gallery.

Hunt Hall (1936), formerly the Dr. Albert F. Hunt Junior High School, is on School St. It houses the parking clerk and student ID services in the basement and classrooms on the upper floors.

Clifford House (1925), a former home near the Alumni Center and Maxwell Library, houses the Political Science Department.

Dr. Edward W. Minnock Institute for Global Engagement (1990), a former home and formerly the Davis Alumni Center. Now houses the Minnock Institute for Global Engagement.

Christian Fellowship Services Building, on Shaw Road, is another former house.

Clement C. Maxwell Library (1971) is a four-story cement-and-brick structure located on Shaw Road with secondary entrances on Park Ave. It is named for former college president Clement C. Maxwell. The facility has over 300,000 volumes, an assorted collection of music and videos, and many classrooms. The third floor Special Collections area features a small museum and specialized collection on Abraham Lincoln. A Starbucks kiosk is located on the ground floor by the IT Support Services office.

The Adrian Rondileau Student Union (1970) was built on the site of Boyden Park on Park Street. It was known as the Student Union until the retirement of then-president Adrian Rondileau, where it was renamed to The Adrian Rondileau Campus Center until the 2019-2020 Academic Year. The center contains ballrooms and conference rooms, a cafeteria, an open-access computer lab, and a small dining room, and also houses offices for the Center for Multicultural and International Affairs, the Office of Student Involvement and Leadership, the Program Committee, the Student Government Association, Visitor Information, Career Services, and Conference and Events Services. The building was given a $3.5 million renovation in 2013, including a new street-level main entrance and enlarged windows and doors.

Bridgewater State University Auditorium is a semi-annex to the RSU building, and has two levels of seating and a number of classrooms and offices below it for the Communications, Theatre, and Music Departments. The Beach Boys once held a live performance in the auditorium, and it was home to the world premiere of "Drakula: The Rock Opera".
Dana Mohler-Faria Science and Mathematics Center (2011), named after one of the university's prior presidents, is on Park Ave and is home to the school's mathematics, computer science, and science departments (Physics, Chemistry,  Biology, and Earth Sciences and Geography). At , the Conant Science Center is the largest building on campus. The land separating it from Pope Hall (see below) contains a small park, a memorial area, and a greenhouse. This replaces the original Conant Science Building from 1964 and has an observatory on the roof. Behind the science building, adjacent to the park and to athletic practice fields, is the campus power plant. This building is often referred to as "DMF" by students.
Welcome Center (2015). The two-story facility houses the undergraduate and transfer admissions offices, along with the university's financial aid offices.
John J. Kelly Gymnasium (1957). Located across from the library and next to the science building is this gymnasium, which succeeded the Boyden Gymnasium and preceded the Tinsley Center (see below) as the main athletic building for the campus. It features large and small gyms and a swimming pool. The bottom floor houses classrooms used primarily by the School of Education and Allied Studies. Near the gymnasium is the Catholic Center.
A short distance from the campus in the woods off 400 Summer Street is the old observatory (1973), which is no longer in use. As of 2019, the sight has since been demolished and remains vacant.

East Campus

The John Joseph Moakley Center for Technological Applications (1995) is named for the late former US Representative John Joseph Moakley. This facility features computer labs and a large technologically enhanced auditorium.

The faculty union, MSCA, occupies a small house on Burrill Avenue, across from the Moakley Center.
Walter and Marie Hart Hall (1979) is connected to the Moakley Center and contains classrooms and offices for the Department of Mathematics and Computer Science, the Department of Secondary Education, the Department of Elementary and Early Childhood Education, and the Psychology Department.
Martha Burnell Hall (1979), located on Hooper Street and connected to Hart Hall, is a former 400-student elementary school that was run cooperatively by Bridgewater State University and the Bridgewater-Raynham Regional School District. It served as a model school and an area for student teaching and pre-practica experiences, replacing the former Martha Burnell School in Harrington Hall. In 2008, the elementary students moved to other schools in the town of Bridgewater, and Bridgewater State College re-appropriated the building for its own use. A dance studio has been added.
East Campus Commons (2002) houses a dining facility, the campus bookstore, and a Dunkin' Donuts. It is located across a small courtyard from East Hall (see below), a new co-ed dorm constructed at the same time.

The Adrian Tinsley Center (2002) was constructed at the same time as East Campus Commons and East Hall and is named after the university's immediate past president, Adrian Tinsley. It is located behind the Great Hill Student Apartments and Swenson Field, and is the new home of the college's athletic programs. The building contains a modern fitness center as well as a large partitioning gymnasium, a running track on the second floor, and classrooms.

Operations Center (2003), also constructed at the same time as the Tinsley Center and East Hall, is located slightly downhill from Shea and Durgin Halls (see below). This facility houses the Campus Police Headquarters and the offices of carpenters, custodial services, electricians, mechanics, groundskeepers, a locksmith, painters, plumbers, recycling, and transportation.
The Massachusetts Bay Transportation Authority runs a commuter rail train station on the BSU campus. It is located on East Campus near Crimson and Weygand halls. This is the Middleborough/Lakeville Line, which runs from Middleborough to Boston's South Station.

Residential life
Normal schools, because they were state institutions, received no bequests from wealthy alumni. After the Civil War, in 1869, the first college dormitory was constructed, called Normal Hall. This was a coed dormitory which was split half and half. Boys on one side, girls on the other. Students would contribute a specific amount of money for food, and the principal would then purchase supplies at the nearest wholesale. Any surplus amount of money at the end of the year was split up between those who had paid. In the 1890s this procedure was discontinued and a set price for board was established.

In later years, as enrollment grew beginning in 1933, new dormitories were constructed: Woodward Hall and Tillinghast. In the post-war period, more dormitories were built: Pope Hall, Scott Hall, Durgin Hall, and Shea Hall.

West Campus

Woodward Hall (1924) was constructed following the campus fire as a replacement for the old Woodward dormitory of 1911. It was formerly an all-female dormitory, but since the 2007–08 school year has been a freshman co-ed dormitory.

Scott Hall (1960, renovated and re-opened fall 2009), located behind the Campus Center and across from the Davis Alumni Center, is a co-ed residence hall.  Scott Hall was an all-male dormitory until it's renovation in 2009.

Pope Hall (1960, renovated and re-opened fall 2009), in front of the Campus Center, across from the Art Center, and next to the science building, is a co-ed residence hall.  Pope Hall was an all-female dormitory until its renovation in 2009.

East Campus

Frankland W. L. Miles, Jr., Hall (1989), a co-ed suite-style dormitory constructed in 1989. It is directly adjacent to DiNardo Hall and the two are often considered one main dormitory, separated by a small central courtyard.
V. James DiNardo Hall (1989), a co-ed suite-style dormitory constructed in 1989. It is directly adjacent to Miles Hall and the two are often considered one main dormitory, separated by a small central courtyard.
Stonehouse Hall (2002), formerly known as East Hall is a co-ed dorm, located across a small courtyard from the East Campus Commons. It is one of three dorms with full climate control.
Great Hill Student Apartments (1978), located up Great Hill from East Hall, is a series of apartment buildings for upperclassmen. It is the only location on campus where alcoholic beverages are allowed.

Shea and Durgin Halls (1967) occupy a symmetrical building up Great Hill from the apartments and house freshmen. The Dr. Henry Rosen Memorial Tennis Courts are in front of the building.
Crimson Hall (2007) is a co-ed residence for upperclassmen located next to Weygand Hall and East Campus Commons. Crimson is one of three dorms with full climate control and the only dorm that contains a dining facility.
Weygand Hall (2013) is the newest residential hall on campus, housing 500 students. It is built on the site of the former Lower Great Hill Parking Lot. It is to the east of Crimson Hall, south of East Hall and East Campus Commons, and to the west of the Parking Garage. It is also close to the MBTA Commuter Rail stop. It is a co-ed residence for upperclassmen, featuring suites similar to Crimson Hall. Weygand is one of three dorms with full climate control. On the ground level of the building, on the side closer to the MBTA stop, is Counseling and Health Services (formerly in Tillinghast Hall)

Student life

Clubs and organizations
Bridgewater State University has over 160 clubs and organizations.

Four sororities, three fraternities and one co-educational fraternity are offered at BSU: Alpha Sigma Tau, founded in 2014, Delta Phi Epsilon, founded on December 8, 2010, Gamma Phi Beta, founded November 22, 1987, Phi Sigma Sigma, founded in 1989, Kappa Delta Phi, founded on April 14, 1900, Phi Kappa Theta, founded in 1889, Sigma Pi, and Phi Pi Delta.

Bridgewater State's Student Government Association (SGA) is an organization of students who represent the Bridgewater State community. Through SGA, the student body can express their academic and social wants and needs. SGA is made up of five different boards: the policy board, finance board, events board, election board, and media board.

Campus media

The Comment
The Comment had its start in 1927. At the time The Comment served “as bulletin of school affairs and to make each class better acquainted with the activities and interests of other classes." Today, The Comment has about 20 staff writers and prints nine newspapers per semester printing 1100 copies each time. It is funded by the SGA (Student Government Association).  The Comment has a website that is updated daily with news about the school and sports at Bridgewater State University, but also with current news of the nation. Their main motive is to relate the stories back to Bridgewater students. With that being said, it is a common occurrence to see faces and stories of students in the newspaper. The Comment focuses on upcoming events rather than reviews to catch hold of the reader's interest.

WBIM

WBIM-FM/91.5, (originally known as “We're Bridgewater Instructional Media”) is one of the longest running and  one of few fully student-run college radio stations in the Northeast and has been on the air since November, 1972. WBIM-FM specializes in up-and-coming artists, alternative rock, and indie rock. The station promotes the programs through Facebook, Twitter, and their website, which also streams the music live during every show.

Commuting

 Commuters pay an estimated total of $7,553 a year to attend Bridgewater. The cost of the parking decal for part-time students is $65 and full-time students is $160. A full-time student has 12 or more credits and a part-time student has 11 or less credits.

Students can choose from several lots to park in, depending on the time of day. Spring Street Lot is located off of Spring Street and can be accessed by taking Route 104 or Route 18. The lot is located right behind the railroad tracks, a short distance from campus. One is located near the bookstore and Crimson Hall Dormitories. West Campus lots are not available to commuters prior to 4pm. Hooper Street Lot is located near Burnell Hall and Hart Hall. Swenson Field Lot is located in front of the Bridgewater State football field. The newest addition to the parking lots is the parking garage, which opened in January 2012. The garage has approximately 840 parking spaces for students. The parking garage is for commuters and is located behind Crimson Hall and Shea-Durgin Hall and is adjacent to the BSU Police Station. All commuter lots close at 2AM daily.

The Railroad is another way commuters travel to the school campus. Bridgewater State is served by the MBTA Commuter Rail. The train station is located at 85 Burrill Avenue; commuters cut through the MBTA parking lot from the train station for easy access to the campus. The railroad tracks divide the campus in half between East and West campus. There is a small walkway underpass beneath the rail line which allows students to walk between East and West campus, along with an at-grade railroad crossing on Plymouth St., next to the Welcome Center, for motorists to drive between campuses. The stops on the line go all the way from South Station to Lakeville. The Commuter Rail takes about 45 minutes to get to South Station in Boston.

Athletics 

Bridgewater State University fields 22 varsity athletic teams (10 men's 12 women's) competing at the NCAA Division III level.

Future expansion

West Campus

The college had planned a $100 million renovation and expansion of the 1964 Marshall Conant Science Building, but the plans changed, and instead most of the old building was demolished and replaced with a new facility, which opened in 2011.

Additions to Pope and Scott Halls opened in fall 2009, increasing their capacity by 150 beds each.

Renovations and additions to the Rondileau Campus Center (RCC) began in spring 2013 and were finished by December. The project cost the school more than $3.5 million and included lowering the main entrance on Park Avenue to street level, with the stairs being replaced by ramps for improved accessibility, installation of larger, more energy-efficient windows and doors, and interior upgrades.

In April 2014, construction began on a new Welcome Center on Plymouth Street. The building is a two-story, 15,000-square-foot facility, and it houses the undergraduate and transfer admissions offices, along with the university's financial aid offices. Construction of the Welcome Center was completed in the Spring of 2015.

Renovations and additions to Woodward Hall began in June 2014 and finished shortly before the Fall 2014 semester commenced. The renovation included the installation of new floors, ceilings and walls, along with new bedroom furniture and the installation of an elevator & entrance stairs.

East Campus

Crimson Hall, a new 400-bed residence hall on the East Campus, opened in the fall of 2007.

The college has constructed a new 600-space parking area, the Tower Lot, behind the Operations Center. The lot where the new residence hall is being built was a 1,000-spot parking lot. The new building has taken 400 of those 1,000. The Tower Lot has been built in an attempt to regain some parking spots lost during the construction.
There has been a discussion of building a fine and performing arts center in the distant future.

A new residence hall, Weygand Hall, was constructed on East Campus in 2013. The building uses geothermal and solar energy to minimize energy usage.

The roughly 200-space parking lot next to the MBTA railroad underpass on East Campus has been converted into a park to balance the construction of a parking garage behind Crimson Hall. Construction on the park was completed in late 2012.

Cape Cod campus
In November 2013, the university announced plans to open a satellite campus on Cape Cod. The opening of this satellite campus helped to accommodate the high number of students who commute daily to the main campus from Cape Cod. Approximately 600 Bridgewater State students reside on or commute from Cape Cod to the main campus in Bridgewater. The campus is located in the former MacArthur School in South Yarmouth, Massachusetts. This satellite campus opened in January 2015, offering undergraduate and graduate courses in Early Childhood Education, Educational Leadership, Secondary Education, Reading, and Special Education, along with certificate programs in Business and Social Work. The campus offers a number of undergraduate credit courses in History beginning in Summer 2015.

Attleboro campus 
In January 2009 a small location was opened up in Attleboro, Massachusetts. It is attached to Bristol Community College. Located at 11 Field Road, Attleboro, MA 02703

Media
Bridgewater State University has a student-run radio station, 91.5 WBIM FM.

Bridgewater State University has had its own student-run newspaper since 1927, called The Comment.

The Bridge, Bridgewater State University's student journal of literature and fine art, was established in 2004. The journal has won many national awards, including multiple Gold Crown and Gold Circle awards from the Columbia Scholastic Press Association, and the 2006 and 2011 National Pacemaker Award for collegiate magazines from the Associated Collegiate Press.

Notable people

Alumni
Sarah Louise Arnold (1859-1943), first dean of Simmons College; national president, Girls Scouts
 Clara Bancroft Beatley (1858-1923),  educator, lecturer, author
Isawa Shūji, Japanese Educator during the Meiji Period
Stephen Canessa, (Bachelor's degree), former member of the Massachusetts House of Representatives (served 2006–2011)
 Robert Correia, (MEd 1968), member of the Massachusetts House of Representatives (served 1977–2008); former Mayor of Fall River, Massachusetts (served 2008–2010)
 Jeff Corwin, (B.S.), actor, conservationist, producer, popular TV host
 Christopher Dijak, professional wrestler currently signed to WWE's developmental brand NXT.
 Jeffrey Donovan, actor
 James H. Fagan, (B.A. 1969), member of the Massachusetts House of Representatives (1993–2011) 
 Rebecca Field, part of the ensemble cast of October Road
 Mark Goddard, actor, film writer
 Lou Gorman, (Master's degree), former general manager of the Boston Red Sox (1988–1993)
 Jeff Gorton, general manager of the New York Rangers
 Walter Harding, (B.S.), distinguished professor, prominent scholar
 Gayle McLaughlin, Mayor of the city of Richmond, California
 Peter McNeeley, former professional heavyweight boxer
 Raymond J. McNulty, Dean of the School of Education at Southern New Hampshire University
 Paul Melicharek, PIFL football player for the Lehigh Valley Steelhawks
 Joan Menard, former member of the Massachusetts Senate (served 1999–2011); former member of the Massachusetts House of Representatives (served 1979–1999)
 Debbie Mueller, only American winner of the Dublin Marathon, 1984 winner of Twin Cities Marathon, pioneer of woman's road racing, BSU Hall of Fame inductee of 1989
 Cristina Nardozzi, Miss Massachusetts USA 2005
 Warren G. Phillips, (B.A., M.A. in Teaching Physical Sciences, M.Ed. in Instructional Technology), teacher, inducted into the National Teachers Hall of Fame 2010
 Ann Hobson Pilot, (hon. D.Mus), principal harpist of the Boston Symphony Orchestra and the Boston Pops
 Martin V. Pratt, member of the Wisconsin State Assembly
 Jason Schappert, aviator
 Chris Sparling, screenwriter and director
 Frank Palmer Speare, (1889), first president of Northeastern University
 Robert Stack, actor and former host of Unsolved Mysteries
 Ken Stone, professional mixed martial artist
 David B. Sullivan, (MEd), member of the Massachusetts House of Representatives (served 1997–2013)
 Karl Wiedergott, voice actor on The Simpsons

Faculty
 John Bardo, educator, President of Wichita State University, Chancellor of Western Carolina University.
 Richard T. Moore, Massachusetts state senator

References

External links

Official website
Official athletics website

 
Educational institutions established in 1840
Universities and colleges in Plymouth County, Massachusetts
1840 establishments in Massachusetts
Public universities and colleges in Massachusetts